Spoliation may refer to:

Looting
 Spoliation of evidence in a criminal investigation

See also
Spoliation Advisory Panel
Nazi plunder